Shortstop is the second album by the American singer-songwriter Sara Hickman, released in 1990.

Critical reception
Trouser Press called the album a "sleek commercial effort," writing that Hickman "rises to the challenge with exquisite vocal control and clever, inventive songs on such diverse topics as Salvador Dali, American hostages, sisterly love and the foibles of male sexuality."

Release
"I Couldn't Help Myself" was an adult contemporary hit.  Shortstop was Hickman's sole album for Elektra; she was dropped after its release, in part, because she did not include her Arachnophobia soundtrack song, "Blue Eyes Are Sensitive to the Light."

Track listing

Track 12 is not listed on the back cover.

Personnel
Sara Hickman – acoustic guitar, guitar, vocals, background vocals, classical guitar
Gerald Albright – saxophone
Paulinho Da Costa – percussion
Chris Douridas – background vocals
Dan Dugmore – pedal steel
Denny Fongheiser – drums
James Harrah – electric guitar
Randy "The Emperor" Jackson – bass guitar
Dennis Karmazyn – cello
David Kershenbaum – background vocals
Brian Kilgore – percussion
Larry Klein – bass guitar, fretless bass
Abraham Laboriel – bass guitar
Nick Lane – trombone
Ricky Lawson – drums
David Lindley – mandolin
Steve Madaio – trumpet
Alton McHerrin – background vocals
Brad McLemore – classical guitar
John Melliwell – clarinet
Phil Parlapiano – organ
Tim Pierce – electric guitar
Ian Ritchie – tenor saxophone
Phil Shenale – organ, string section, keyboards, tin whistle
Elaine Summers – background vocals
Esther Terry – background vocals
David Woodord – flute, tenor saxophone
Boys choir (aka "the popcorn kids") on "Salvador"
Ben McCrary
Charles McCrary
Quincy McCrary
Chad Duno
Kenny Ford
The Rose Banks Choir on "Take It Like a Man"
Alfie Silas
Rose Stone
Pattie Howard
Howard McCrary
Perry Morgan

Production
Producers: Sara Hickman, David Kershenbaum
Engineers: Marc DeSisto, Paul McKenna
Assistant engineer: Al Phillips
Arranger: Sara Hickman
Horn arrangements: Sara Hickman, Ian Ritchie
Choir arrangement: Charity McCrary, Alfie Silas, Rose Stone
Art direction: Sara Hickman, Tiffany Shope
Design: Sara Hickman, Tiffany Shope
Set painting: Kelly Stribling

References 

1990 albums
Sara Hickman albums
Elektra Records albums
Albums produced by David Kershenbaum